Rotoroa may refer to:

Rotoroa, Tasman, New Zealand
Rotoroa Island, New Zealand

See also 
 Lake Rotoroa (disambiguation)